Oskemen Airport or Ust-Kamenogorsk Airport  is an airport in Kazakhstan. The airport services regional jets.

Facilities
It has one asphalt paved runway designated 12/30 which measures .

Airlines and destinations

See also
Transport in Kazakhstan
List of the busiest airports in the former USSR

References

External links
 
 

Airports built in the Soviet Union
Airports in Kazakhstan
East Kazakhstan Region

Access[edit]

Public transport[edit]

Bus[edit] 
Public bus No. 12 of municipal bus lines connects the airport with the city centre of Oskemen.

Other buses are ....

Buses do NOT run at night.

Busfare is 130Tenge (oct 2022).